The connection between music and politics, particularly political expression in song, has been seen in many cultures.  Music can express anti-establishment or protest themes, including anti-war songs, but pro-establishment ideas are also represented, for example, in national anthems, patriotic songs, and political campaigns. Many of these types of songs could be described as topical songs.

Introduction
Although music influences political movements and rituals, it is not clear how or to what extent general audiences relate to music on a political level. Songs can be used to portray a specific political message. However, there may be barriers to the transmission of such messages; even overtly political songs are often shaped by and reference their contemporary political context, making an understanding of the history and events that inspired the music necessary in order to fully comprehend the message. The nature of that message can also be ambiguous because the label "political music" can be applied either to songs that merely observe political subjects, songs which offer a partisan opinion, or songs which go further and advocate for specific political action. Thus a distinction has been made, for example, between the use of music as a tool for raising awareness, and music as advocacy.

Furthermore, some forms of music may be deemed political by cultural association, irrespective of political content, as evidenced by the way Western pop/rock bands such as The Beatles were censored by the State in the Eastern Bloc in the 1960s and 1970s, while being embraced by younger people as symbolic of social change. This points to the possibilities for discrepancy between the political intentions of musicians (if any), and reception of their music by wider society. Conversely, there is the possibility of the meaning of deliberate political content being missed by its intended audience,  reasons for which could include obscurity or delivery of message, or audience indifference or antipathy.

It is difficult to predict how audiences will respond to political music, in terms of aural or even visual cues. For example, Bleich and Zillmann found that "counter to expectations, highly rebellious students did not enjoy defiant rock videos more than did their less rebellious peers, nor did they consume more defiant rock music than did their peers", suggesting there may be little connection between behaviour and musical taste. Pedelty and Keefe argue that "It is not clear to what extent the political messages in and around music motivate fans, become a catalyst for discussion, [or] function aesthetically".

However, in contrast they cite research that concludes, based on interpretive readings of lyrics and performances with a strong emphasis on historical contexts and links to social groups, that "given the right historical circumstances, cultural conditions, and aesthetic qualities, popular music can help bring people together to form effective political communities".

Recent research has also suggested that in many schools around the world, including in modern democratic nations, music education has sometimes been used for the ideological purpose of instilling patriotism in children, and that particularly during wartime patriotic singing can escalate to inspire destructive jingoism.

Plato wrote: "musical innovation is full of danger to the whole state, and ought to be prohibited. When modes of music change, the fundamental laws of the state always change with them;" although this was written as a warning it can be taken as a revolutionary statement that music is much more than just melodies and harmonies but an important movement in the life of all human beings.

Folk music

American folk revival
The song "We Shall Overcome" is perhaps the best-known example of political folk music, in this case a rallying-cry for the US Civil Rights Movement. Pete Seeger was involved in the popularisation of the song, as was Joan Baez. During the early part of the 20th century, poor working conditions and class struggle lead to the growth of the Labour movement and numerous songs advocating social and political reform. The most famous songwriter of the early 20th century "Wobblies" was Joe Hill. Later, from the 1940s through the 1960s, groups like the Almanac Singers and The Weavers were influential in reviving this type of socio-political music. Woody Guthrie's "This Land Is Your Land" is one of the most famous American folk songs and its lyrics exemplify Guthrie's socialistic patriotism. Pete Seeger's "Where Have All the Flowers Gone?", was a popular anti-war protest song. Many of these types of songs became popular during the Vietnam War era. "Blowin' in the Wind", by Bob Dylan, was a hit for Peter, Paul and Mary, and suggested that a younger generation was becoming more aware of global problems than many of the older generation. In 1964, Joan Baez had a top-ten hit in the UK with "There but for Fortune" (by Phil Ochs); it was a plea for the innocent victim of prejudice or inhumane policies. Many topical songwriters with social and political messages emerged from the folk music revival of the 1960s, including Bob Dylan, Joan Baez, Phil Ochs, Tom Paxton, Buffy Sainte-Marie, Judy Collins, Arlo Guthrie, and others.

The folk revival can be considered as a political re-invention of traditional song, a development encouraged by Left-leaning folk record labels and magazines such as Sing Out! and Broadside. The revival began in the 1930s and continued after World War II. Folk songs of this time gained popularity by using old hymns and songs but adapting the lyrics to fit the current social and political conditions. Archivists and artists such as Alan Lomax, Lead Belly and Woody Guthrie were crucial in popularising folk music, and the latter began to be known as the Lomax singers. This was an era of folk music in which some artists and their songs expressed clear political messages with the intention of swaying public opinion and recruiting support. In the UK, Ewan MacColl and A. L. Lloyd performed similar roles, with Lloyd as folklorist and MacColl (often with Peggy Seeger) releasing dozens of albums which blended traditional songs with newer political material influenced by their Communist activism.

In the later, post-war revival, folk music found a new audience with college students, partly since universities provided the organisation necessary for sustaining music trends and an expanded, impressionable audience looking to rebel against the older generation. Nevertheless, the rhetoric of the United States government during the Cold War era was very powerful and in some ways overpowered the message of folk artists, such as in relation to public opinion regarding Communist-backed political causes. Various Gallup Polls that were conducted during this time suggest that Americans consistently saw Communism as a threat; for example, a 1954 poll shows that at the time 51% of Americans said that admitted Communists should be arrested, and in relation to music 64% of respondents said that if a radio singer is an admitted Communist he should be fired. Leading figures in the American folk revival such as Seeger, Earl Robinson and Irwin Silber were or had been members of the Communist Party, while others such as Guthrie (who had written a column for CPUSA magazine New Masses), Lee Hays and Paul Robeson were considered fellow travellers. As McCarthyism began to dominate the United States population and government, it was more difficult for folk artists to travel and perform since folk was pushed out of mainstream music. Artists were blacklisted, denounced by politicians and the media, and in the case of the 1949 Peekskill Riots, subject to mob attack.

In general, the significance of lyrics within folk music reduced as it became influenced by rock and roll. However, during the popular folk revival's last phase in the early 1960s, new folk artists such as Bob Dylan and Phil Ochs began writing their own, original topical music, as opposed to mainly adapting traditional folksong.

Contemporary Western folk music
Although public attention shifted to rock music from the mid 1960s, folk singers such as Joan Baez and Tom Paxton continued to address political concerns in their music and activism. Baez's 1974 Gracias a la Vida album was a response to events in Chile and included versions of songs by Nueva Canción Chilena singer-songwriters Violeta Parra and Victor Jara. Paxton albums such as Outward Bound and Morning Again continued to highlight political issues. They were joined by other activist musicians such as Holly Near, Ray Korona, Charlie King, Anne Feeney, Jim Page, Utah Phillips and more recently David Rovics.

In Ireland, the Wolfe Tones is perhaps the best known band in the folk protest/rebel music tradition, recording political material since the late 1960s including songs by Dominic Behan on albums such as Let the People Sing and Rifles of the I.R.A. Christy Moore has also recorded much political material, including on debut solo album Paddy on the Road, produced by and featuring songs by Dominic Behan, and on albums such as Ride On (including "Viva la Quinta Brigada"), Ordinary Man and various artists LP H Block to which Moore contributed "Ninety Miles from Dublin", in response to the Republican prisoners' blanket protest of the late 1970s. Earlier in the decade, The Barleycorn had held the #1 spot on the Irish charts for five weeks in 1972 with their first release "The Men Behind the Wire", about internment, with all profits going to the families of internees; Republican label R&O Records likewise released several records around this time to fundraise for the same cause, including the live album Smash Internment, recorded in Long Kesh, and The Wolfhounds' recording of Paddy McGuigan's "The Boys of the Old Brigade".

In the UK, the Ewan MacColl tradition of political folk has been continued since the 1960s by singer-songwriters such as Roy Bailey, Leon Rosselson and Dick Gaughan. Since the 1980s, a number of artists have blended folk protest with influences from punk and elsewhere to produce topical and political songs for a modern independent rock music audience, including Billy Bragg, Attila the Stockbroker, Robb Johnson, Alistair Hulett, The Men They Couldn't Hang, TV Smith, Chumbawamba and more recently Chris T-T and Grace Petrie.

Folk music around the world
Folk music had a strong connection with politics internationally. Hungary, for instance, experimented with a form of liberal Communism in the late Cold War era, which was reflected in much of their folk music. During the late twentieth century folk music was crucial in Hungary, Romania, Czechoslovakia and Yugoslavia as it allowed ethnicities to express their national identity in a time of political uncertainty and chaos.

In Communist China, exclusively national music was promoted. A flautist named Zhao Songtim – a member of the Zhejiang Song-and-Dance Troupe – attended an Arts festival in 1957 in Mexico but was punished for his international outlook by being expelled from the Troupe, and from 1966 to 1970 underwent "re-education". In 1973 he returned to the Troupe but was expelled again following accusations.

An example of folk music being used for conservative, rather than radical, political ends is shown by the cultural activities of Edward Lansdale, a CIA chief who dedicated part of his career to counter-insurgency in the Philippines and Vietnam. Lansdale believed that the government's best weapon against Communist rebellion was the support and trust of the population. In 1953 he arranged for the release of a campaign song widely credited with helping to elect Philippine president Ramon Magsaysay, an important US anti-communist ally. In 1965, intrigued by local Vietnamese customs and traditions, and the potential use of 'applied folklore' as a technique of raising consciousness, he began to record and curate tapes of folk songs for intelligence purposes. He also urged performers such as Phạm Duy to write and perform patriotic songs to raise morale in South Vietnam. Duy had written topical songs popular during the anti-French struggle but then broke with the Communist-dominated Viet Minh.

Blues and African-American music
Blues songs have the reputation of being resigned to fate rather than fighting against misfortune, but there have been exceptions. Bessie Smith recorded protest song "Poor Man Blues" in 1928. Josh White recorded "When Am I Going to be Called a Man" in 1936 – at this time it was common for white men to address black men as "boy" – before releasing two albums of explicitly political material, 1940's Chain Gang and 1941's Southern Exposure: An Album of Jim Crow Blues. Lead Belly's "Bourgeois Blues" and Big Bill Broonzy's "Black, Brown and White" (aka "Get Back") protested racism. Billie Holiday recorded and popularised the song "Strange Fruit" in 1939. Written by Communist Lewis Allan, and also recorded by Josh White and Nina Simone, it addressed Southern racism, specifically the lynching of African-Americans, and was performed as a protest song in New York venues, including Madison Square Gardens. In the post-war era, J.B. Lenoir gained a reputation for political and social comment; his record label pulled the planned release of 1954 single "Eisenhower Blues" due to its title and later material protested civil rights, racism and the Vietnam War. John Lee Hooker also sang 'I Don't Wanna Go to Vietnam" on 1969 album Simply the Truth.

Paul Robeson, singer, actor, athlete, and civil rights activist, was investigated by the FBI and was called before the House Un-American Activities Committee (HUAC) for his outspoken political views. The State Department denied Robeson a passport and issued a "stop notice" at all ports, effectively confining him to the United States. In a symbolic act of defiance against the travel ban, labour unions in the U.S. and Canada organised a concert at the International Peace Arch on the border between Washington state and the Canadian province of British Columbia on May 18, 1952. Robeson stood on the back of a flat bed truck on the U.S. side of the border and performed a concert for a crowd on the Canadian side, variously estimated at between 20,000 and 40,000 people. He returned to perform a second concert at the Peace Arch in 1953, and over the next two years two further concerts were scheduled.

Disco
Disco, contrary to popular belief, originated in Black queer communities and offered these communities a form of salvation or safe haven from social turmoil during the 1970s, in the Bronx and other parts of New York. It was agreed by many members prominent in the Disco scene that the music was about love and the vitality of "absorbing the feeling", but the question regarding its political import received mixed responses. Although the songs themselves may not have explicitly made political claims, it's important to note that disco, for many, was a "form of escape" and noted a "dissolve of restrictions on black/gay people". The spirit of the 60s as well as the experience of Vietnam and black/gay liberation spurred the almost-frenzied energy pertinent in these discotheques. Not only did discos allow marginalized individuals an opportunity to express their sexuality and appreciate one another's diversity, they had the ability to influence popular music. Although once mutually exclusive, discotheques allowed for the coming together of black music and pop; this shows how disco music not only led to a social appreciation for diversity, but offered a platform on which Black artists could succeed.
The eventual commercialization of disco set in motion its decline. This new commodified disco, very different than its diverse and queer roots, idealized the white individual and favored heteronormative relations. This not only allowed for the roots of such a diverse movement to be lost, but the erasure of the liberation and escapism it offered many minorities.

Latin American music

Reggaeton 
As a musical genre born out of the Caribbean and Latin American regions, Reggaeton frequently engages with the tropes of other popular musical genres like love, money, and sexual conquests; but has also been used as a form of social commentary and has played a significant role in promoting social change. Reggaeton often addresses issues such as poverty, racism, police brutality, and political corruption in its lyrics. Additionally, many Reggaeton artists use their platforms to speak out against inequalities and social issues by organizing concerts, rallies, and charity events to raise awareness and funds for various social justice causes. Reggaeton also serves as a vehicle for empowering marginalized communities, particularly Black communities, Latin American people, women, and the LGBTQ+ community. Throughout its history, people have come to believe Reggaeton has become more than just a music genre but a voice for social justice and activism.

Nueva Canción 
Nueva canción or "New Song" is a musical movement that emerged in Latin America in the late 1950s and early 1960s. In a Remezcla article, Julyssa Lopez discloses that the genre focused on socially and politically conscious lyrics, often addressing the oppression and inequality experienced by marginalized communities, especially the Indigenous culture. Global languages and cultures professor Robert Neustadt affirms that artists like Violeta Parra, Victor Jara, and Inti-Ilimani used their music to speak out against censorship, state violence, and human rights abuses.

Nueva canción was relevant because it gave voice and visibility to social and political issues and provided a platform for marginalized communities to express their struggles and resistance through music. It also played a significant role in the fight against oppressive regimes and contributed to the development of cultural identity and social consciousness in Latin America.

Salsa

Rock music
Many rock artists, as varied as Crosby, Stills, Nash & Young, Bruce Springsteen, Little Steven, Rage Against the Machine, Radiohead, Manic Street Preachers, Megadeth, Enter Shikari, Architects, Muse, System of a Down, Sonic Boom Six and Drive-By Truckers have had openly political messages in their music. The use of political lyrics and the taking of political stances by rock musicians can be traced back to the 1960s counterculture, specifically the influence of the early career of Bob Dylan, itself shaped by the politicised folk revival.

1960s–70s counterculture
During the 1960s and early 1970s counterculture era, musicians such as John Lennon commonly expressed protest themes in their music, for example on the Plastic Ono Band's 1969 single "Give Peace a Chance". Lennon later devoted an entire album to politics and wrote the song Imagine, widely considered to be a peace anthem. Its lyrics invoke a world without religion, national borders or private property.
 
In 1962–63, Bob Dylan sang about the evils of war, racism and poverty on his trademark political albums "The Freewheelin' Bob Dylan" and "The Times They Are a-Changin'" (released in 1964), popularising the cause of the Civil Rights Movement. Dylan was influenced by the folk revival, as well as by the Beat writers, and the political beliefs of the young generation of the era. In turn, while Dylan's political phase comes under the 'folk' category, he was known as a rock artist from 1965 and remained associated with an anti-establishment stance that influenced other musicians – such as the British Invasion bands – and the rock music audience, by broadening the spectrum of subjects that could be addressed in popular song.

The MC5 (Motor City 5) came out of the Detroit, Michigan underground scene of the late 1960s, and embodied an aggressive evolution of garage rock which was often fused with socio-political and countercultural lyrics, such as in the songs "Motor City Is Burning", (a John Lee Hooker cover adapting the story of the Detroit Race Riot (1943) to the 1967 12th Street Detroit Riot), and "American Ruse" (which discusses U.S. police brutality as well as pollution, prison, materialism and rebellion). They had ties to radical leftist groups such as Up Against the Wall Motherfuckers and John Sinclair's White Panther Party. MC5 was the only band to perform a set before the August 1968 Democratic Convention in Chicago, as part of the Yippies' Festival of Life where an infamous riot subsequently broke out between police and students protesting the April assassination of Martin Luther King Jr. and the Vietnam War.

Other rock groups that conveyed specific political messages in the late 1960s/early 1970s – often in regard to the Vietnam War – include The Fugs, Country Joe and the Fish, Jefferson Airplane, Creedence Clearwater Revival, and Third World War, while some bands, such as The Beatles, The Rolling Stones and Hawkwind, referenced political issues occasionally and in a more observational than engaged way, e.g. in songs like "Revolution", "Street Fighting Man", "Salt of the Earth" and "Urban Guerrilla".

Punk rock

Notable punk rock bands, such as Crass, Conflict, Sex Pistols, The Clash, Dead Kennedys, Black Flag, Refused, American Standards, Discharge, MDC, Aus-Rotten, Billy Talent, Anti-Flag, and Leftöver Crack have used political and sometimes controversial lyrics that attack the establishment, sexism, capitalism, racism, speciesism, colonialism, and other phenomena they see as sources of social problems.

Since the late 1970s, punk rock has been associated with various left-wing or anti-establishment ideologies, including anarchism and socialism. Punk's DIY culture held an attraction for some on the Left, suggesting affinity with the ideals of workers' control, and empowerment of the powerless (though it is arguable that the punk movement's partial focus on apathy towards the establishment, combined with the fact that in many situations, punk rock music generated income for major record companies, and the notable similarities between some strains of anarchism and capitalism, meant that the punk movement ran contrary to left-wing ideologies) – and the genre as a whole came, largely through the Sex Pistols, to be associated with anarchism. The sincerity of the early punk bands has been questioned – some critics saw their referencing of revolutionary politics as a provocative pose rather than an ideology – but bands such as Crass and Dead Kennedys later emerged who held strong anarchist views, and over time this association strengthened, as they went on to influence other bands in the UK anarcho-punk and US hardcore subgenres, respectively.

The Sex Pistols song "God Save the Queen" was banned from broadcast by the BBC in 1977 due to its presumed anti-Royalism, partly due to its apparent equation of the monarchy with a "fascist regime". The following year, the release of debut Crass album The Feeding Of the 5000 was initially obstructed when pressing plant workers refused to produce it due to sacrilegious lyrical content. Crass later faced court charges of obscenity related to their Penis Envy album, as the Dead Kennedys later did over their Frankenchrist album artwork.

The Clash are regarded as pioneers of political punk, and were seen to represent a progressive, socialistic worldview compared to the apparently anti-social or nihilistic attack of many early punk bands. Partly inspired by 1960s protest music such as the MC5, their stance influenced other first and second wave punk/new wave bands such as The Jam, The Ruts, Stiff Little Fingers, Angelic Upstarts, TRB and Newtown Neurotics, and inspired a lyrical focus on subjects such as racial tension, unemployment, class resentment, urban alienation and police violence, as well as imperialism. Partially credited with aligning punk and reggae, The Clash's anti-racism helped to cement punk's anti-fascist politics, and they famously headlined the first joint Rock Against Racism (RAR)/Anti Nazi League (ANL) carnival in Hackney, London, in April 1978. The RAR/ANL campaign is credited with helping to destroy the UK National Front as a credible political force, aided by the support received from punk and reggae bands.

Many punk musicians, such as Vic Bondi (Articles of Faith), Joey Keithley (DOA), Tim McIlrath (Rise Against), The Crucifucks, Bad Religion, The Proletariat, Against All Authority, Dropkick Murphys and Crashdog have held and expressed left-wing views. Dead Kennedys singer Jello Biafra, as well as T.S.O.L. frontman Jack Grisham, have run as candidates for public office under left-wing platforms. However, some punk bands have expressed more populist and conservative opinions, and an ambiguous form of patriotism, beginning in the U.S with many of the groups associated with 1980s New York hardcore, and prior to that in the UK with a small section of the Oi! movement.

An extremely small minority of punk rock bands, exemplified by (1980s-era) Skrewdriver and Skullhead, have held far-right and anti-communist stances, and were consequently reviled in the broader, largely Leftist punk subculture.

Rock the Vote
Rock the Vote is an American 501(c)(3) non-profit, non-partisan organization founded in Los Angeles in 1990 by Jeff Ayeroff for the purposes of political advocacy. Rock the Vote works to engage youth in the political process by incorporating the entertainment community and youth culture into its activities. Rock the Vote's stated mission is to "build the political clout and engagement of young people in order to achieve progressive change in our country."

Hip hop

Hip hop music has been associated with protest since 1982, when "The Message" by Grandmaster Flash and the Furious Five became known as the first prominent rap record to make a serious “social statement”. However the first political rap release has been credited to Brother D and the Collective Effort's 1980 single “How We Gonna Make the Black Nation Rise?” which called the USA a “police state” and rapped about historical injustices such as slavery and ethnic cleansing.

Later in the decade hip hop band Public Enemy became "perhaps the most well-known and influential political rap group" and released a series of records whose message and success "directed hip-hop toward an explicitly self-aware, pro-black consciousness that became the culture's signature throughout the next decade," helping to inspire a wave of politicised hip hop by artists such as X Clan, Poor Righteous Teachers, Brand Nubian, 2 Black 2 Strong and Paris.

The group N.W.A had a political take within their songs. Their most controversial song, "Fuck tha Police", shone a light on police brutality and the use of racially biased tactics in Los Angeles during the '80s and '90s. Verses such as "Fuck the police, coming straight from the underground, a young nigga got it bad 'cause I'm brown, and not the other color so the police think they have the authority to kill a minority," led them to receive arrest threats for performing police-bashing songs. Their song Express Yourself addressed the restrictive limits on rappers in the industry; the video to the song expresses the view that black people have no voice and are punished when they speak up.

Eminem's tenth album, Kamikaze, contained many political messages, most of them revolving around his disapproval of Donald Trump being elected President of the United States. He stated he was willing to lose fans over this criticism and rapped: "And any fan of mine/who’s a supporter of his/I’m drawing in the sand a line/you’re either for or against,"

During Donald Trump's presidential campaign, Kanye West took the opportunity to support the Republican candidate by urging his fans to vote for Trump. Although West has historically been against the Republican administrations, he has been one of Donald Trumps most vocal supporters. On April 27, 2018, Kanye West and fellow rapper, T.I., released a collaboration called "Ye vs. the People" that consisted of West and T.I.'s opposing political views. The song, a conversation between the two rappers, became popular not for its musical touch, but because of the courage West and T.I. showed by releasing a controversial song in a time of high political disagreement.

Reggae
Jamaican Reggae of the 1970s and the 1980s is an example of influential and powerful interaction between music and politics. A top figure-head in this music was Bob Marley. Though Marley was not in favor of politics, through his politicized lyrics he was seen as a political figure. In 1978 Bob Marley's One Love Peace Concert brought Prime Minister Michael Manley and the opposition leader Edward Seaga together (leaders connected to notorious rival gang leaders, Bucky Marshall and Claude Massop, respectively), to join hands with Marley during the performance; this was the "longest and most political reggae concert ever staged, and one of the most remarkable musical events recorded." Throughout this period many reggae musicians played for and spoke or sung in support of Manley's People's National Party, a campaign credited with helping the PNP's victory in the 1972 and 1976 elections.

Popular music
Popular music found throughout the world contains political messages such as those concerning social issues and racism. For example, Lady Gaga's song "Born This Way" has often been known as the international gay anthem, as it discusses homosexuality in a positive light and expresses the idea that it is natural. Furthermore, the natural disaster of Hurricane Katrina received a great political response from the hip hop music community. The content of the music changed into a response showing the complex dynamic of the community, especially the black community, while also acting a sometimes contradictory protest of how the disaster was handled in the aftermath. This topic even reached beyond the locality of New Orleans, as the issue of the disaster and racism was mentioned by other rappers from other regions of the country.

Pop music is common for its sensationalized and mass-produced uplifting beats. Many artists take advantage of their large followings to spread awareness of political issues in their music. Similar to Lady Gaga's "Born This Way," Macklemore's song "Same Love" also expresses support and homage to the LGBTQ+ community. Furthermore, Beyoncé's album "Lemonade" has been hailed as awe-inspiring and eye-opening with many of the songs addressing political issues such as racism, stereotyping, police brutality, and infidelity. 
These songs, aside from being catchy and uplifting, discuss serious issues in a lighthearted and simplified manner allowing people to understand while also commonly being influenced by the current political climate such as the violent attacks on the Bataclan Theater in Paris and the Pulse Nightclub in Orlando.

Country music
American country music contains numerous images of traditional values and family and religious life, as well as patriotic themes. Songs such as Merle Haggard's "The Fightin' Side of Me" and "Okie from Muskogee" have been perceived as patriotic songs showing an "us versus them" mentality directed at the counterculture or "hippies" and the anti-war crowd, though these were actually misconceptions by listeners who failed to understand their satirical nature. 

Many American country songs addressed political and cultural views in the 1960s and 1970s, with mainstream and independent country artists releasing singles that conveyed support for conservative candidates or military action, anti-communist statements, or, in some cases, anti-hippie sentiments often framed as humorous put-downs. These tropes have continued in such songs as Toby Keith's "Courtesy of the Red, White and Blue (The Angry American)" in 2002 and Bryan Lewis's "I Think My Dog's a Democrat" in 2016.

More recent American country songs containing political messages include Keith Urban's "Female" which details the psychological and emotional impact on women of sexist language, slut-shaming, and lack of representation in politics. The lyrics of Carrie Underwood's 2018 song "Love Wins" also identifies themes of prejudice, hatred, and politics. Through this song, Underwood expresses the idea that the best way to close the political divide and strengthen what she sees to be a broken world is through unity, loving each other, and working together in times of crisis.

Country artist Kacey Musgraves integrates politics into her lyrics, speaking about gay rights and cannabis consumption. Her song "Follow Your Arrow" is considered to be a radical perspective on same-sex marriage, in that it differs from the conservative point of view that is normally found in country music.

African American country rapper Cowboy Troy, the stage name of Troy Lee Coleman III, incorporates real-life problems into his music, calling for societal change. He sheds light on concepts like class analysis, gender issues, and popular narratives about the "white" working class. One of his songs, "I Play Chicken With The Train," acknowledges conservative and progressive ideas that tend to be brought up in presidential elections.

Although race is a rarely addressed topic in country music, some artists have made an effort to approach this theme in their songs. Brad Paisley's 2013 album Wheelhouse included the track "Accidental Racist", which became controversial, generating many negative reviews.  Will Hermes, in his critique in Rolling Stone, commented: "It's probably not going to win any awards for songcraft and rapping, but in the wake of movies like Django Unchained and Lincoln, it shows how fraught racial dialogue remains in America."  Paisley stated, "This song was meant to generate discussion among the people who listen to my albums."

Classical music
Beethoven's third symphony was originally called "Bonaparte". In 1804 Napoleon crowned himself emperor, whereupon Beethoven rescinded the dedication. The symphony was renamed "Heroic Symphony composed to Celebrate the Memory of a Great Man".

Verdi's chorus of Hebrew slaves in the opera Nabucco is a kind of rallying-cry for Italians to throw off the yoke of Austrian domination (in the north) and French domination (near Rome)—the "Risorgimento". Following unification, Verdi was awarded a seat in the national parliament.

In late nineteenth century England, choral music was performed by mass choirs of workers and much music was written for them, by, for example, Samuel Coleridge-Taylor and Ralph Vaughan Williams. When the young Vaughan Williams wondered what kind of music to write, Hubert Parry  advised him to "write choral music as befits an Englishman and a democrat". Others, including Frederick Delius and Vaughan Williams's friend Gustav Holst also wrote choral works, often using the words of Walt Whitman.

Richard Taruskin of the University of California accused John Adams of "romanticizing terrorists" in his opera The Death of Klinghoffer (1991).

In the Soviet Union
RAPM (The Russian Association of Proletarian Musicians) was formed in the early 1920s. In 1929 Stalin gave them his backing. Shostakovich had dedicated his first symphony to Mikhail Kvadri. In 1929 Kvardi was arrested and executed. In an article in The Worker and the Theatre, Shostakovich's Tahiti Trot (used with the ballet The Golden Age) was criticised; Ivan Yershov claimed it was part of "ideology harmful to the proletariat"". Shostakovich's response was to write his third symphony, The First of May (1929) to express "the festive mood of peaceful construction".

Prokofiev wrote music to order for the Soviet Union, including Cantata for the 20th Anniversary of the October Revolution (1937). Khachaturian's ballet Spartacus (1954/6) concerns gladiator slaves who rebel against their former Roman masters. It was seen as a metaphor for the overthrow of the Czar. Similarly Prokofiev's music for the film Alexander Nevsky concerns the invasion of Teutonic knights into the Baltic States. It was seen as a metaphor for the Nazi invasion of the USSR. In general Soviet music was neo-romantic while Fascist music was neo-classical.

Music in Nazi Germany
Stravinsky stated in 1930, "I don't believe anyone venerates Mussolini more than I"; however by 1943 Stravinsky was banned in Nazi Germany because he had chosen to live in the USA. Beginning in 1940, Carl Orff's cantata Carmina Burana was performed at Nazi Party functions, and acquired the status of a quasi-official anthem. In 1933 Berlin Radio issued a formal ban on the broadcasting of jazz. However, it was still possible to hear swing music played by German bands. This was because of the moderating influence of Goebbels, who knew the value of entertaining the troops. In the period 1933–45 the music of Gustav Mahler, a Jewish Austrian, virtually disappeared from the concert performances of the Berlin Philharmonic. Richard Strauss's opera Die Schweigsame Frau (The Silent Woman) was banned from 1935 to 1945 because the librettist, Stefan Zweig, was a Jew.

White Power music

Racist music or white power music is music associated with and promoting neo-Nazism and white supremacy ideologies. Although musicologists point out that many, if not most early cultures had songs to promote themselves and denigrate any perceived enemies, the origins of Racist music is traced to the 1970s. By 2001 there were many music genres with 'white power rock' the most commonly represented band type, followed by National Socialist black metal. 'Racist country music' is mainly an American phenomena while Germany, Great Britain, and Sweden have higher concentration of white power bands. Other music genres include 'fascist experimental music' and 'racist folk music'. Contemporary white-supremacist groups include "subcultural factions that are largely organized around the promotion and distribution of racist music." According to the Human Rights and Equal Opportunity Commission "racist music is principally derived from the far-right skinhead movement and, through the internet, this music has become perhaps the most important tool of the international neo-Nazi movement to gain revenue and new recruits." The news documentary VH1 News Special: Inside Hate Rock (2002) noted that Racist music (also called 'Hate music' and 'Skinhead rock') is "a breeding ground for home-grown terrorists." In 2004 a neo-Nazi record company launched "Project Schoolyard" to distribute free CDs of the music into the hands of up to 100,000 teenagers throughout the U.S., their website stated, "We just don't entertain racist kids … We create them." Brian Houghton, of the National Memorial Institute for the Prevention of Terrorism, said that Racist music was a great recruiting tool, "Through music ... to grab these kids, teach them to be racists and hook them for life."

Pushing political campaigns through music 
Aware of the motivational power of music, politicians across the world seek to incorporate different songs into their campaigns. However, the viewpoints of the musicians and the politicians using their music occasionally clash. In addition to protest songs created specifically to call attention to matters of social change, musicians around the world resist politicians. Governments and leaders also assert their resistance to critical musicians in a variety of ways. Within each different national and cultural context, musician resistance and politician response is a unique relationship.

In the United States 
In the United States, musicians including Neil Young, the Dropkick Murphys and Explosions in the Sky have taken issue with or action against such politicians as President Donald Trump, Wisconsin Governor Scott Walker and Texas Senator Ted Cruz. These conflicts between popular musicians and politicians in the United States are common in the election cycle, but play out differently.

Trump used Young's song "Rockin in the Free World" from the beginning of his presidential campaign against Hillary Clinton in 2015. While Young argued Trump was not authorized to use the song in his campaign, a Trump spokesperson stated the song was legally obtained through a license with ASCAP and that the campaign "will continue to [use his song] regardless of Neil’s political views." And though the song itself, from 1989, may appear to be an endorsement of the American lifestyle, closer examination reveals criticism of the George H. W. Bush administration. This suggests that the effect of music in a political campaign cannot be limited to lyrics alone. Despite the song's pointed words and Young's continued resistance, the Trump campaign began using the song again in 2018 in his presidential reelection campaign.

Similarly, in 2015, Scott Walker utilized the Dropkick Murphys' popular cover of Woody Guthrie’s "I’m Shipping Up to Boston" at a political event in Iowa. Owing heavily to disagreements over issues like unions, the band tweeted "please stop using our music in any way … we literally hate you!!!" to Walker. While there was no threat of legal action, the band took to social media to distance themselves from Walker and resist his usage of their song.

Some musicians have effectively used copyright law to resist the political use of their music. When Ted Cruz included the Explosions in the Sky song "Your Hand in Mine" in an endorsement video for Texas Governor Greg Abbott, the band tweeted they were "absolutely not okay with it." The band's label, Temporary Residence, forced the Cruz campaign to remove the video due to a violation of U.S. Copyright Law. Legally, politicians can license music without consulting the artists themselves through deals with performance rights organizations. Where the Trump campaign sidestepped consulting Young and legally licensed "Rockin' in the Free World" from such an organization (ASCAP), Cruz's effort did neither.

In the United States there is also a long and complex history of public schools instilling support for the military through their musical activities, and of music teachers either endorsing or resisting these tendencies. Musicologists have noted the impact of militarism in US society, arguing that "militarism endangers music education" and that although military models are inappropriate for the education of schoolchildren in a democracy, there is evidence that "In the United States, we find an array of music education partnership projects with the military that would be unthinkable in many other countries..

India 
After the 2014 Lok Sabha election, Narendra Modi was sworn in Prime Minister of India. Modi, who is notable for this effective nationalistic appeal to the Indian people, quickly began to centralize power and subject both civil and foreign non-governmental organization to scrutiny.

With Modi's populist support and increasing governmental power, musicians face a unique social and political landscape in their options for resistance. In May 2020, an arrest warrant was brought against singer Mainul Ahsan Noble for making derogatory comments toward Modi on Facebook. While the lawsuit was filed by a private Indian citizen who “could not accept such defamatory remarks against the PM of [India].” With India's populist turn, criticism and resistance against politicians is now riskier for musicians. The late singer S.P. Balasubrahmanyam carefully resisted the actions of Modi when he suggested that artists from Southern India were subject to different restrictions than Bollywood artists at Modi's 2019 Change Within gathering. Where Noble's overt comments ignited anger and legal action, Balasubrahmanyam's muted criticism did not draw the same response. Because Modi's populist policy choices strongly suggest to the Indian people that he is concerned with welfare of the everyday citizen, more citizens come to his aid and resistance to Modi becomes more difficult for contemporary Indian musicians.

However, criticism of Modi may be less careful abroad. Desi-American punk The Kominas and several other South Asian performers organized an anti-Modi benefit in New York City to coincide with a Trump administration-organized, pro-Modi event in Houston. The New York City pro-Kashmir opposition event triggered attacks and condemnation from some Indians online, but no international legal actions against the bands and artists involved. Despite the opposition event highlighting human rights abuses regarding the military lockdown of Kashmir, the populist view of Modi as a purifier of corruption and defender of the Indian people persists among much of India. To further expand their musical acts of resistance, the Kominas are considering bringing the punk anti-Modi opposition events to different countries and even perhaps New Delhi.

Brazil 
Since his election as the President of Brazil in 2018, Jair Bolsonaro has become an increasingly controversial leader. Much like conservative contemporaries Donald Trump and Narendra Modi, Bolsonaro has been described as both a populist and nationalist. While Bolsonaro directly supports far-right policies on gay rights and gun ownership, more moderate conservatives also claim that he supports their interests. To gain support from Brazil's conservative voters, Bolsonaro's speeches are heavily nationalistic and patriotic. While Bolsonaro's direct appeals to the people are more limited within his national addresses, he emphasizes a prideful brand of Brazilian nationalism. As a figure whose policies and actions are deeply polarizing and divisive, Bolsonaro has become a main source of scorn and criticism for Brazilian musicians both domestic and abroad.

Musician Caetano Veloso, who was exiled during Brazil's military dictatorship that lasted from the 1964 to 1985, called Bolsonaro's heavy-handed nationalistic rhetoric and leadership “an utter nightmare.” While Veloso's brand of music is not protest music, he takes the opportunity to speak out and use his visibility for resistance. In August 2020, Veloso joined a chorus of prominent Brazilian figures in mocking Bolsonaro for his perceived role in an embezzlement and money laundering scheme.

While some Brazilian artists like Veloso resist mainly from their social media accounts, Brazil has a rich history of protest music against its former authoritarian dictatorship regime that is continued by many contemporary artists. Artists from all over the country have found ways to resist, criticize, and allude to Bolsonaro in their works. Troubadour Chico César took a direct approach by asserting that Bolsonaro's supporters as fascists, composer Manu da Cuíca veiled his criticism included a warning about Bolsonaro as one of the dangerous “gun-toting messiahs,” and singer Marina Iris indirectly worked in criticism against the regime as persistent themes of angst and frustration toward the current state of Brazil. These customary forms of Brazilian music, rooted in indigenous musical forms, are a key form of anti-status quo music.
In response to the resistance, instead of adopting music like Trump or relying on the support of his followers like Modi, Bolsonaro drastically cut the public support and resources for musicians, film-makers, and visual artists. Many artists viewed this act as payback for their resistance. However, several right-wing Brazilian rappers have also picked up the mantle in the music scene to defend and support Bolsonaro.

See also

Anarcho-punk
Arsch huh, Zäng ussenander
Birlikte
Brexit in popular culture
Crust punk
Ecomusicology
Environmentalism in music
Freedom songs
Hardline (subculture)
Irish rebel music
List of anarchist musicians
List of anti-war songs
List of national anthems
List of political punk songs
List of socialist songs
List of songs about the September 11 attacks
List of songs about the Vietnam War
Love Music Hate Racism
Music and political warfare
Nazi punk
New musicology
Nonviolent resistance
Nueva canción
Oi!
People's Songs
Political song in Egypt
Riot grrrl
Rock Against Racism Northern Carnival
Rock Against Sexism
Role of music in World War II
Stop Murder Music
This machine kills fascists
War song

References

Further reading

Lieberman, Robbie (1988). My Song is my Weapon: People's Songs, American Communism, and the Politics of Culture, 1930-50, Un. Of Illinois Press

Perone, James E. (2004). Music of the Counterculture Era, Westport: Greenwood Press
Rachel, Daniel (2016). Walls Come Tumbling Down: The Music and Politics of Rock Against Racism, 2 Tone and Red Wedge, London: Picador, 
Reuss, Joanne C & Reuss, Richard A. (2000). American Folk Music and Left-Wing Politics, Scarecrow Press
Rodnitsky, Jerome (1976). Minstrels in the Dawn: The Folk-Protest Singer as a Cultural Hero, Chicago: Nelson Hall

Serge Denisoff, R. (1971). Great Day Coming: Folk Music and the American Left. Champaign: Un. Of Illinois Press

External links

Music for Democracy – Music Activism Political Action Organization
 by Kyle Gann
 Written during the 2004 American Presidential election campaign.
  An extensive discussion in particular about modernism and Marxism between composer Gordon Downie and pianist Ian Pace.

 
Musicology
Political communication
Works about politics